Lion Brewery or Lion Breweries may refer to:


Australia 
 Lion Brewing and Malting Company of Adelaide, South Australia, now defunct
 Lion Brewery, Townsville, a heritage-listed building in Queensland, Australia

New Zealand 
 Lion Breweries, a brewery company from New Zealand now trading as Lion Nathan

Sri Lanka 
 Lion Brewery (Sri Lanka) or Lion Brewery (Ceylon) PLC, a brewery in Sri Lanka

United Kingdom 
 The Lion Brewery, a defunct brewery in Oxford, England
 Lion Brewery Co, a brewery in Lambeth, London
 Camerons Brewery, a brewery in West Hartlepool
 Lion Brewery, Blackburn, England, owned by Matthew Brown brewery from 1927 until its closure in 1991

United States 
 Lion Brewery, Inc., a brewery in Pennsylvania
 Lion Brewery New York, a defunct brewery in New York

See also
 Mohan Meakin Brewery, an Asian brewing group of companies who make Lion Beer